Ludovico Simoneta (c, 1500–1568) was an Italian Roman Catholic bishop and cardinal.

Biography

Simoneta was born in Milan ca. 1500, the son of Palatine Count Alessandro Simoneta and Antonia Castiglioni. He was the nephew of Cardinal Giacomo Simoneta.

He studied at Milan, becoming a doctor of both laws.  He was admitted to the Collegio degli Avvocati of Milan in 1533, and practiced law in Milan and Pavia.

On 19 December 1537, following the resignation of his uncle Giacomo, Ludovico Simoneta was elected Bishop of Pesaro.  He subsequently participated in the Council of Trent 1545-47.

In 1549, he moved to Rome, becoming a lawyer of the Apostolic Signatura.  On 17 May 1560 he was appointed a datary.

Pope Pius IV made him a cardinal priest in the consistory of 26 February 1561.  He received the red hat and the titular church of San Ciriaco alle Terme Diocleziane on 10 March 1561.  He resigned the government of the Diocese of Pesaro sometime before 9 May 1561.  On 10 November 1561 the pope named him papal legate to the Council of Trent.  He became prefect of the Apostolic Signatura on 8 June 1563.

He was a participant in the papal conclave of 1565-66 that elected Pope Pius V.  He opted for the titular church of Sant'Anastasia on 15 November 1566.

He died in Rome on 30 April 1568.  He was buried in Santa Maria degli Angeli e dei Martiri.

See also
His portrait on Getty Images

References

1568 deaths
16th-century Italian cardinals
Year of birth unknown
Year of birth uncertain
Bishops and archbishops of Pesaro
16th-century Italian Roman Catholic bishops